David Louis Leland (6 January 1932 in Alassio, Italy – 7 November 1948 in Los Angeles, California, USA) was an Italian-born American child actor who appeared in several Hollywood films in the 1940s.

His father Louis Leland (1879-1963) was born in Rome to an American father and Italian mother; his mother Helena Leland (1901/02-1989) was born in London.

He moved to the US in the early 1940s and appeared in several films, notably alongside Laurel and Hardy in one of their later efforts, Nothing But Trouble.

He died aged sixteen while suffering from sepsis.

Filmography

References
Biography on Lord Heath.com

External links
 

Italian people of English descent
Italian people of American descent
American male child actors
Italian male child actors
1932 births
1948 deaths
Italian male film actors
American male film actors
People from Alassio
20th-century American male actors
20th-century Italian male actors
Italian emigrants to the United States